is a travel agency based on the fifth floor of Trust Tower in Kamiya-cho, Tokyo in Kamiyacho, Minatoku, Tokyo, Japan, specializing in low-cost package tours.  The company was founded as International Tours Co., Ltd. in 1980 by Hideo Sawada, born in 1951, and renamed "H.I.S." in 1990.

In Japan, H.I.S. has 303 branches throughout the country and a global network of 185 branches in 124 cities abroad. H.I.S. holds a majority stake in Orion Tour, Asia Atlantic Airlines and a minority stake in Skymark Airlines. It owns two hotels in Australia, one called Watermark Hotel and Spa on the Gold Coast, Queensland and the Watermark Hotel Brisbane, and a cruise company called Cruise Planet.

Hideo Sawada bought an interest in the Mongolian agricultural Khan Bank and believes Japanese tourism to Mongolia will increase. Sawada Holdings Co., Ltd also owns 40% of the shares of the Russian bank Solid Bank.

The Henn na Hotel owned by  H.I.S. Co . in Sasebo, Nagasaki Prefecture, has been recognized by Guinness World Records as “the first robot-staffed hotel” in the world, according to the chief of the Huis Ten Bosch theme park. Henn na Hotel, meaning "strange hotel" in Japanese, opened to the public in July 2015. This high class robot hotel has 144 rooms and 186 robotic employees, some of which are multilingual (Japanese, English, Chinese, Korean). The aim of Henn na Hotel as proposed by Hideo Sawada is that by "having robots in charge of the reception and placing robots everywhere, we aim to make it the most efficient hotel in the world" by reducing manpower.

Affiliations
International Air Transport Association, Japan Association Of Travel Agents

Subsidiaries and Affiliates

Travel business (75)
ORION TOUR Co.,LTD
H.I.S. INTERNATIONAL TOURS　(NY) INC.
Hotels (10)	THE WATERMARK HOTEL GROUP PTY. LTD. 
Theme Park (14)	HUIS TEN BOSCH Co.,Ltd
Other (11)	Kyusyu Sangyo Kotsu Holdings Co.,Ltd.                    
GROUP MIKI HOLDINGS LIMITED
Japan Holiday Travel
Ohshu Express Ltd.
Cruise Planet Co., Ltd.
Merit Travel Group
Jonview Canada
Red Label Vacations (redtag.ca, itravel2000.com)
Flyhub

H.I.S. world network

Europe
Istanbul, Turkey 
Baku, Azerbaijan
Rome and Milan, Italy
London, Great Britain
Paris and Nice, France
Frankfurt, Germany
Madrid and Barcelona, Spain
Wien, Austria
Zurich, Switzerland
Moscow, Russia
Athens, Greece

North America
New York
California
Hawaii
Mexico
Canada
Cancun

South America
São Paulo, Brazil

Asia
South Korea
Hong Kong
Singapore
Bangladesh
Maldives
Bangkok
Indonesia
Malaysia
Vietnam
Myanmar
Mongolia
Philippines

Oceania
Brisbane, Sydney, Melbourne, Perth, Gold Coast & Cairns, Australia
Auckland & Christchurch, New Zealand
Nadi, Fiji

Sources

External links 

 

Travel agencies
Service companies based in Tokyo
Transport companies established in 1980
Companies listed on the Tokyo Stock Exchange
Travel and holiday companies of Japan
Online travel agencies
1980 establishments in Japan